Andrew Mark Rutherfurd Aliaga (born December 21, 1988) is a Bolivian swimmer. At the 2012 Summer Olympics, he competed in the Men's 100 metre freestyle, finishing in 41st place overall in the heats, failing to qualify for the semifinals. Rutherfurd is a member of the Church of Jesus Christ of Latter-day Saints.

References

External links

Bolivian male freestyle swimmers
Living people
People from California, Pennsylvania
Olympic swimmers of Bolivia
Swimmers at the 2012 Summer Olympics
1988 births
Swimmers from Pennsylvania
Bolivian Latter Day Saints
Latter Day Saints from Pennsylvania
Competitors at the 2014 South American Games
21st-century Bolivian people